Siti Rosnani Binte Azman (born 22 May 1997) is a Singaporean professional footballer who plays as a defender for WE League club INAC Kobe Leonessa, as well as the Singapore women's national football team.

Football career 
Azman started playing competitive football at 11 years old. She played for the Woodlands Secondary School and Republic Polytechnic.

Club career 
Azman previously played for the South West Queensland Thunder in the National Premier Leagues Women's in Australia. She made 31 appearances for the club. 

In 2021, Azman became the first Singaporean to play professionally in Japan, when she joined INAC Kobe Leonessa of the Japan Women's Empowerment Professional Football League. Azman struggled in INAC Kobe due to the different level of play and language barrier. In an attempt to bridge to the gap, she put in extra training and ultimately injured herself, tearing her left gluteus maximus muscle, sidelining her for two months.

Azman requested for a loan move at the end of 2021 and after a successful trial with Kibi International of Nadeshiko League Division 2, joined Kibi International on loan from February to June 2022, until the end of her contract with INAC Kobe. In June, Azman made her first appearance in the Japan League in a 60th minute substitution.

Kibi International signed Azman on 1 July 2022 for six months.

International career 
Azman was selected in the provisional 29 players national team squad for 2023 Southeast Asian Games.

References 

1997 births

Living people

Singaporean women's footballers

Singapore women's international footballers
Women's association football defenders
INAC Kobe Leonessa players
WE League players